Bonnie Jean Sharp (September 3, 1946–March 21, 2013) was an American politician who served in the Kansas House of Representatives as a Democrat from the 31st district from 1997 until the end of 2006. Sharp was elected in 1996, and was re-elected continuously until she declined to run for re-election in 2006.

References

1946 births
2013 deaths
Democratic Party members of the Kansas House of Representatives
Women state legislators in Kansas
21st-century American women politicians
21st-century American politicians
20th-century American women politicians
20th-century American politicians
Politicians from Kansas City, Kansas
University of Missouri–Kansas City alumni